Kent Carlsson is a Swedish former tennis player.

Kent Carlsson or Carlson may also refer to:

Kent Carlson (born 1962), ice hockey player
Kent Carlsson (sailor) (born 1951), Swedish Olympic sailor 
Kent Carlsson (politician) (1962–1993), Swedish politician

See also
Kent Karlsen (born 1973), Norwegian footballer
Kent Karlsson (born 1945), Swedish footballer